During the 2008–09 German football season, FC Energie Cottbus competed in the Bundesliga.

Season summary
Cottbus were relegated after finishing 16th and losing to 1. FC Nürnberg in the relegation play-off. As of 2022, this remains their most recent season in the top flight of German football.

First-team squad
Squad at end of season

Left club during season

Competitions

Bundesliga

League table

References

Notes

FC Energie Cottbus seasons
FC Energie Cottbus